Tomoya Osawa may refer to:
Tomoya Osawa (footballer, born 1984) (大沢 朋也), Japanese footballer
Tomoya Osawa (footballer, born 2002) (大澤 朋也), Japanese footballer